Douglas Park may refer to

Places
Douglas Park, a Scottish stadium
Douglas Park, New South Wales, an Australian town
Douglas Park, California, U.S.
Douglass Park, a Chicago park formerly named Douglas Park
Douglas Park (Langley), an urban public park in British Columbia, Canada
Douglas Park (Rock Island), a stadium that served as home for the Rock Island Independents professional American football team
Douglas Park (Santa Monica), a park in Santa Monica, California

People
Brad Park (Douglas Bradford Park; born 1948), Canadian ice hockey player
Douglas Park (businessman), owner of Park's Motor Group and chairman of Rangers Football Club

See also
Stephen A. Douglas Tomb, also known as Douglas Monument Park, Chicago park